The Cheng brothers (Er Cheng, 二程, lit 2 Chengs) were two brothers Cheng Hao and Cheng Yi who were prominent Confucian philosophers during the Song dynasty.

Scholarship 
In their early years the Cheng brothers studied under Zhou Dunyi and developed the science of nature from Mencius to Zhou Dunyi in Philosophy, establishing a system of science centered on the "Divine Principle". The most important academic proposition of the brothers is that "everything is just a heavenly principle.

Differences 

Cheng Hao is lively and natural, but Cheng Yi is serious and upright, sacred and inviolable, and even inhumane, which is the "face of Taoism" seen in later generations. In terms of Women Chastity, Cheng Yi thought, "...... If you take someone who is out of line to match your body, you are out of line. The first thing that I did was to ask Cheng Yi: "Widowhood is poor and helpless, can she remarry? Some people are afraid of freezing to death and starving to death, so they use the cold and hunger as an excuse.，As the standard for measuring the virtuous ladies. Zhu Xi (1130-1200) also agreed with this statement in his "Letter to Chen Shizhong": "In the past, Mr. Ichuan tried to discuss this matter, thinking that starving to death is a small matter, but losing modesty is a big matter. But when viewed by a gentleman who knows the scriptures and understands reason, he can see that it is not easy. He advocated that women should "be devoted to one another" and suppress "human desire".

Rating 
Jiang Chenying has summarized: "Henan Erchengzi to hold respect for the study of teaching. Its purpose to strict and respectful as scrupulous, its work began to move appearance, correct color, out of the rhetoric gas between, and pushed to the end of sex up to the sky to know the fate of the base of the work of the sage, the scholar no time and can leave."

Xiong Zhichu said: "Since Yao and Shun, the saints and sages have passed on to each other without crossing one respect. The one who respects is the one who goes through the top and the bottom, and becomes the way of the beginning and the end. ...... Ercheng both to a respect to receive the transmission of a thousand saints, and Yichuan is especially for the main nothing suitable for the solution, and thus repeatedly invented, so that the scholars have to hold, as a transcendent into the sage. Zhu Zi said Cheng's merit in the latter, the most is the main respect."

See also
Cheng-Zhu school

References

Bibliography 

 葛瑞漢（A. C. Graham）著，程德祥等譯：《中國的兩位哲學家：二程兄弟的新儒學》

Duos
Chinese Confucianists
Chinese philosophy